Raja Mohar Singh was a Rajput of Chandravanshi(Somavanshi) dynasty. Raja Mohar Singh was the Raja of Maurha from 1894 until 1923.

History
There he built a Bhawan and called it Mohar Bhawan after himself. Subsequently, the area around the Bhawan became known as Maurha.

See also 
 Maurha

References

People from Ballia district